Quita Sueño Bank (claimed as Quitasueño) is a reef formation of Colombia which was once claimed by the United States, located 110 km north-northeast of Providencia Island.

History 
In 1869, James Jennett claimed the bank for the United States under the Guano Islands Act of 1856. In 1972 the United States and Colombia signed a treaty (ratified in 1981) that abandoned the U.S. claim to the reef. Unlike some islands included in the treaty that were ceded to Colombia, Quita Sueño Bank was regarded by the United States as having no emergent land and thus ineligible for the basis of a sovereignty claim. Rather than being ceded to any particular nation, the claim was simply abandoned with American fishing rights retained. Colombia, which had also made previous claims on the reef, considers the bank to be a part of its San Andres and Providencia Department.

In the northern part of the eastern reef is Quita Sueño Light. The light is erected on top of a square platform. This lighthouse had originally been established by the United States in 1919. The current structure is from 1977.

Nicaragua also had a claim to the bank. On November 19, 2012 the International Court of Justice in The Hague ruled the bank is a part of Colombia. The ICJ found that only one of the 54 features identified by Nicaragua in Quitasueño is an island at high tide and thus eligible for a sovereignty claim.

See also
 List of Guano Island claims

References

Caribbean islands claimed under the Guano Islands Act
Former regions and territories of the United States
International territorial disputes of the United States
Territorial disputes of Colombia
Territorial disputes of Nicaragua
Islands of the Archipelago of San Andrés, Providencia and Santa Catalina
Reefs of Colombia
Caribbean islands of Colombia
Former disputed islands